Bergheim may refer to:

People
 Kristian Bergheim (1926–2010), Norwegian musician
 Stanislaus Bergheim (born 1984), German footballer
 Rüdiger of Bergheim, Bishop of Chiemsee from 1216 to 1233

Places
 Bergheim, Austria, a municipality in Salzburg-Umgebung district in Austria
 Bergheim, Bavaria, a municipality in Bavaria, Germany
 Bergheim, Haut-Rhin, a commune in the Haut-Rhin département in France
 Bergheim, North Rhine-Westphalia, capital of Rhein-Erft-Kreis district in North Rhine-Westphalia, Germany
 Heidelberg-Bergheim, a district of Heidelberg in Germany
 Bergheim, a name for Bærum in Norway
 Bergheim, Texas, an unincorporated community